Robert S. (Bobby) Wolff (born October 14, 1932, San Antonio, Texas) is an American bridge player, writer, and administrator. He is the only person to win world championships in five different categories. He is a graduate of Trinity University.

Wolff was an original member of the Dallas Aces team, which was formed in 1968 to compete against the Italian Blue Team which was dominant at the time. The Aces were successful and won their first world championship in 1970. Wolff has won 11 world championships, over 30 North American championships, and was the president of World Bridge Federation (WBF) 1992–1994, and served as president of American Contract Bridge League (ACBL) 1987. He is the author of a tell-all on bridge chronicling 60 years on the scene, entitled The Lone Wolff, published by Master Point Press. His column, The Aces on Bridge has been appearing daily for over 32 years, is syndicated by United Feature Syndicate in more than 130 newspapers worldwide and is available online two weeks in arrears.

Wolff lived in Dallas at the time of his induction into the ACBL Hall of Fame in 1995.

Bridge accomplishments

Honors
 ACBL Hall of Fame, 1995
 ACBL Honorary Member of the Year, 1995

Awards
 Mott-Smith Trophy 1973
 Fishbein Trophy 1979

Wins
 Bermuda Bowl (7) 1970, 1971, 1977, 1983, 1985, 1987, 1995
 World Open Team Olympiad (1) 1988
 World Open Pairs (1) 1974
 Olympiad Mixed Teams (1) 1972
 Senior International Cup (1) 2000
 North American Bridge Championships (31)
 Vanderbilt (2) 1971, 1973
 Spingold (10) 1969, 1979, 1982, 1983, 1989, 1990, 1993, 1994, 1995, 1996
 Reisinger (8) 1970, 1978, 1979, 1988, 1993, 1994, 1995, 2002
 Grand National Teams (3) 1975, 1977, 1986
 Men's Board-a-Match Teams (4) 1968, 1972, 1973, 1988
 Senior Knockout Teams (3) 2002, 2003, 2005
 Blue Ribbon Pairs (1) 1984
 United States Bridge Championships (16)
 Open Team Trials (12) 1969, 1971, 1973, 1977, 1979 (Dec), 1982, 1984, 1985, 1987, 1988, 1992, 2003
 Senior Team Trials (4) 2000, 2001, 2007, 2009
 Other notable wins:
 Pan American Invitational Open Teams (3) 1974, 1976, 1977

Runners-up
 Bermuda Bowl (4) 1973, 1974, 1975, 1997
 World Open Team Olympiad (3) 1972, 1980, 1992
 North American Bridge Championships (15)
 Vanderbilt (3) 1970, 1981, 1996
 Spingold (2) 1967, 1970
 Chicago (now Reisinger) (1) 1964
 Men's Board-a-Match Teams (4) 1969, 1980, 1984, 1989
 Jacoby Open Swiss Teams (1) 1992
 Senior Knockout Teams (1) 2007
 Life Master Pairs (2) 1960, 1968
 Men's Pairs (1) 1976
 United States Bridge Championships (4)
 Open Team Trials (3) 1974, 1979 (Jan), 1997
 Senior Team Trials (1) 2008
 Other notable 2nd places:
 Forbo-Krommenie Nations Cup (1) 1997
 Sunday Times–Macallan Invitational Pairs (1) 1992
 Cavendish Invitational Pairs (1) 1988

Publications

 Sacrifices (Louisville: Devyn Press, 1985), Championship Bridge no. 30 – pamphlet
 Bidding Challenge: South hands (Devyn, 1986), 21 pp. 
 Bidding Challenge: world championship hands, set 1, Wolff and the Aces (Devyn, 1986), 43 pp. 
 The Lone Wolff: autobiography of a bridge maverick (Master Point Press, 2008), 287 pp., 

Audo-video
 Bobby Wolff's Secrets of Successful Bridge (Dallas, 1987)

References

Further reading

External links
 
 
 
 Aces on Bridge – Daily Columns at BridgeBlogging – Wolff's syndicated newspaper column The Aces on Bridge, two weeks in arrears
   (May 2014, none yet; see WorldCat)

1932 births
American contract bridge players
Contract bridge administrators
Bermuda Bowl players
Contract bridge writers
Living people
People from Dallas
People from San Antonio
Trinity University (Texas) alumni